Deh Now-e Gork Allah (also Romanized as Deh Now-e Gork Allāh; also known as Deh Now-e Gorgallāh, Gorg Allāh, and Gorgollāh) is a village in Rig Rural District, in the Central District of Lordegan County, Chaharmahal and Bakhtiari Province, Iran. At the 2006 census, its population was 635, in 148 families.

References 

Populated places in Lordegan County